The IPW:UK Tag Team Championship was a professional wrestling tag team championship created and promoted by the English professional wrestling promotion International Pro Wrestling: United Kingdom.  The inaugural champions was AK-47 (Ashe and Kris Linell) and they won the titles on July 7, 2005.

The championship was originally established on 7 July 2005 as the IPW:UK Tag Team Championship.  At Weekend of Champions Night 2, AK47 (Ashe and Kris Linnell) defeated the Chav Army (Battalion and Flaming Red) in the finals of a tournament to become the inaugural champions. On 4 May 2008 at IPW:UK Royale Rewards; the reigning IPW:UK Tag Team Champions The Kartel (Sha Samuels and Terry Frazier) defeated the reigning Real Quality Wrestling Tag Team Champions The Thrillers (Joel Redman and Mark Haskins) to unify both titles.  The titles were renamed the IPW:UK British Tag Team Championships.

In August 2012,  then IPW:UK booker Andy Quildan left the company thus Revolution Pro Wrestling (RPW or RevPro) was founded.  At RevPro Summer Sizzler 2012, Project Ego (Kris Travis and Martin Kirby) cashed-in their Money in the Bank briefcase to become the IPW:UK British Tag Team Champions.  After losing the titles on March 30, 2013; Project Ego continued to be recognized as the RPW British Tag Team Champions.

Title history

Combined reigns

By team

By wrestler 
{|class="wikitable" style="text-align: center"
!Rank
!Wrestler
!No. ofreigns
!Combined days
|-
!rowspan=2|1
| Marty Scurll || 2 || 1,125
|-
| Zack Sabre Jr. || 2 || 1,125
|-
!rowspan=2|3
| Chief Deputy Dunne || 2 || 727
|-
| Los Federales Santos Jr. || 2 || 727
|-
!rowspan=2|5
| James Davis || 3 || 700
|-
| Rob Lynch || 3 || 700
|-
!rowspan=2|7
| Cieran Donnelly || 2 || 652
|-
| Danny Duggan || 2 || 652
|-
!rowspan=2|9
| Sha Samuels || 1 || 371
|-
| Terry Frazier || 1 || 371
|-
!rowspan=3|11
| Ares || 1 || 287
|-
| Claudio Castagnoli || 1 || 287
|-
| Marc Roudin || 1 || 287
|-
!rowspan=2|14
| Lewis Howley || 2 || 259
|-
| Sammy Smooth/Sam Stoker || 2 || 259
|-
!rowspan=2|16
| Dave Moralez || 1 || 218
|-
| Jack Storm || 1 || 218
|-
!rowspan=4|18
| Doug Basham || 1 || 217
|-
| Joel Redman || 1 || 217
|-
| Mark Haskins || 1 || 217
|-
| Ricky Hype || 1 || 217
|-
!rowspan=4|22
| Ashe || 1 || 216
|-
| Kris Linnell || 1 || 216
|-
| Kris Travis || 1 || 216
|-
| Martin Kirby || 1 || 216
|-
!26
| James Castle || 1 || 182
|-
!rowspan=2|27
| Jack Sexsmith || 1 || 136
|-
| Robert Sharpe || 1 || 136
|-
!rowspan=4|29
| Amazon || 1 || 119
|-
| Paul Robinson || 1 || 119
|-
| Scott Wainwright || 1 || 119
|-
| Will Ospreay || 1 || 119
|-
!rowspan=2|33
| Darrell Allen || 1 || 112
|-
| RJ Singh || 1 || 112
|-
!rowspan=2|35
| Mikey Whiplash || 1 || 86
|-
| Robbie Dynamite || 1 || 86
|-
!rowspan=2|37
| Dragon Phoenix || 1 || 77
|-
| Spud || 1 || 77
|-
!rowspan=2|39
| Dark Panther || 1 || 49
|-
| Lion Kid || 1 || 49
|-
!rowspan=2|41
| Andreas Corr || 1 || 35
|-
| Jonny Storm || 1 || 35

See also
IPW:UK World Championship
IPW:UK Women's Championship
IPW:UK Junior Heavyweight Championship

References

External links
IPW:UK Tag Team Championship

International Pro Wrestling: United Kingdom championships
National professional wrestling championships
Tag team wrestling championships
Professional wrestling in the United Kingdom